Ramnagar is one of the central part in Hyderabad, India. Ramnagar comes under the constituency of Musheerabad.

It is mainly a residential area which was once located very near to industries like VST (Vazeer Sultan Tobacco, Golkunda Cigarette factory and Charminar Cigarette factory which comprisingly is called Azamabad Industrial area).

Transport

The TSRTC it has bus depot, hence buses transport to all parts of the city.

The closest MMTS Train station is at Jamia Osmania.
Famous St.Pious 'X' Girls High School from past 50 years, several others schools like Mothers high school, Luna high school, Holy trinity etc. are located at Ramnagar. Sowmya Hospital is the only hospital here.

Neighbourhoods in Hyderabad, India